Highway 46 is a highway in the Canadian province of Saskatchewan. Highway 46 intersects Highway 362 and Highway 624 and passes through the communities of Pilot Butte and Balgonie; it is known as McDonald Street within Regina city limits.

History
The present alignment of Highway 46 used to be the original alignment of Highway 1, but was reverted to a gravel grid road when the Trans-Canada Highway was realigned entering Regina along Victoria Avenue in the 1950s. In the early 1980s, Highway 46 was assigned to the route, and was subsequently paved Regina to Pilot Butte. In the early 1990s the highway was paved from Pilot Butte to Balgonie, and it was again re-paved in the summer of 2014.

There are two previous uses of Highway 46 within Saskatchewan. The original route ran from former Provincial Highway 29 at Plenty, through Ruthilda, to Provincial Highway 1 (present-day Highway 4) near Biggar. The route was decommissioned in the 1930s when Highway 51 was constructed between Kerrobert and Biggar. A second use was in the 1960s when Highway 46 travelled from Highway 4 near Val Marie to Claydon; the route became part of Highway 18 in the 1970s.

Major intersections
From west to east:

References 

Pilot Butte, Saskatchewan
046
Roads in Regina, Saskatchewan